The Voice Brasil is a current Brazilian reality talent show which premiered on TV Globo on September 23, 2012. Based on the reality singing competition The Voice of Holland, the series was created by Dutch television producer John de Mol.

The original coaches for the first three seasons were Lulu Santos, Carlinhos Brown, Claudia Leitte and Daniel. Daniel departed after season three and was replaced by Michel Teló from season four onwards. Claudia Leitte last coached for season five, then became coach of The Voice Kids, swapping roles with Ivete Sangalo who became coach of the adult version from season six onwards. Carlinhos Brown didn't return for season 8 being replaced by Iza, leaving Lulu Santos as the only coach left from the inaugural season.

Format
The series is part of The Voice franchise and is based on a similar competition format in The Netherlands entitled The Voice of Holland. The winner is entitled to a R$ 500.000 prize and a recording contract with Universal Music Group.

Blind auditions
In The Blind Auditions, the four coaches form their team of artists (12 in seasons 1–6 and 11, 16 in seasons 8-10 and 18 in season 7) whom they mentor through the remainder of the season. Each judge has the length of the auditionee's performance to decide if he or she wants that singer on his or her team; if two or more judges want the same singer then the singer gets to choose which coach they want to work with. Since season 7, a new twist called "Block" is featured, which allows one coach to block another coach from getting a contestant.

Battle rounds
In The Battles, each coach pairs two of his or her team members to perform together, then chooses one to advance. Coaches are given "steals" (3 in seasons 1–2 and 7-9; 2 in seasons 3–6), allowing each coach to select individuals who were eliminated during a battle round by another coach. In season 10, for the first time, no "steals" are available, and only the fifth coach, Teló, could select eliminated artists to participate in the Comeback Stage. In season 11, the steals then returned, with two steals available for each coach.

Live shows
In the final phase, the remaining contestants of each team will compete against each other in 4–7 weeks of live broadcasts. The television audience will help to decide who moves on. When one team member remains for each coach, these four contestants will compete against each other in the finale, with the most voted singer declared the season's winner.

Coaches' Battle
Introduced in season 5, in the Coaches' Battle, two contestants from two teams battle against each other and the public vote determines who will advance. In season 10, the winner of the battle is decided by the three coaches not involved in the battle. In season 11, the winner is decided in consensus by the two coaches not involved in the battle.

Remix
Introduced in season 5, the Remix round is a way to balance the teams after the Coaches' Battle, which works exactly like the Blind Auditions.

Coaches and hosts

Coaches
The original coaches were revealed in to be: Brazilian axé singer Claudia Leitte, pop rock singer-songwriter Lulu Santos, MPB singer-songwriter Carlinhos Brown and sertanejo singer, Daniel. All four coaches returned for seasons 2 and 3. In 2015, it was announced that Daniel would not return for season 4; sertanejo singer Michel Teló was named his replacement. Leitte took a hiatus after season 5, swapping roles with Ivete Sangalo to become a coach on The Voice Kids. In 2019, it was announced that Iza will join Santos, Teló and Sangalo as coach of season 8 replacing Brown, making it the first season with two female coaches. With Brown's departure, Santos serves as the last remaining coach from the show's inaugural season. In 2020, it was announced by Globo that Sangalo, Iza, Santos, and Teló would be returning for the ninth season. However, on 29 July 2020, it was announced that Carlinhos Brown would return, replacing Sangalo, who had to leave due to her pregnancy. In August 2021, it was announced that the tenth season will debut in October 2021, with new developments. The panel of coaches consists of all winning coaches the series had so far; Brown, Iza, and Lulu, who continued, and Claudia Leitte, who returns after a four-year hiatus, seat on the main red chairs, while the ultimate winning coach, Teló, has a special role. Teló is the coach for the "Comeback Stage", where he selects eliminated artists to have a chance to return to the competition. As phases go by, Teló joins the four coaches on the main stage, having a fifth chair in the scenario for the first time. Lulu, Iza and Teló returned for the eleventh season, and Gaby Amarantos who was once a coach for The Voice Kids joins the former coaches.  The presentation of the program is with Fátima Bernardes and Thaís Fersoza.

Hosts
The show is hosted by sport journalist Tiago Leifert, who has hosted the series since the inaugural season, alongside Mariana Rios, who serves as co-host, backstage interviewer, online and social media correspondent since season 5. Daniele Suzuki was co-host in seasons 1 and 4, Miá Mello co-hosted season 2 and Fernanda Souza in season 3.

Key
 Main host
 Backstage

Series overview

Guest mentors and advisers

Ratings and reception

International broadcasting

Notes

References

External links
Official website on Globo.com

 
Portuguese-language television shows
Rede Globo original programming
Brazilian reality television series
2012 Brazilian television series debuts
Brazilian television series based on Dutch television series